Jamgön Kongtrül Lodrö Thayé (1813–1899), also known as Jamgön Kongtrül the Great, was a Tibetan Buddhist scholar, poet, artist, physician, tertön and polymath. He was one of the most prominent Tibetan Buddhists of the 19th century and he is credited as one of the founders of the Rimé movement (non-sectarian), compiling what is known as the "Five Great Treasuries". He achieved great renown as a scholar and writer, especially among the Nyingma and Kagyu lineages and composed over 90 volumes of Buddhist writing, including his magnum opus, The Treasury of Knowledge.

Overview
Kongtrül was born in Rongyab (rong rgyab), Kham, then part of the Derge Kingdom. He was first tonsured at a Bon monastery, and then at 20 became a monk at Shechen, a major Nyingma monastery in the region, later moving on to the Kagyu Palpung monastery in 1833 under the Ninth Tai Situ, Pema Nyinje Wangpo (1775-1853). He studied many fields at Palpung, including Buddhist philosophy, tantra, medicine, architecture, poetics and Sanskrit. By thirty he had received teachings and empowerments from more than sixty masters from the different schools of Tibetan Buddhism. Kongtrül studied and practiced mainly in the Kagyu and Nyingma traditions, including Mahamudra and Dzogchen, but also studied and taught Jonang Kalachakra. He also went on tour with the fourteenth Karmapa and taught him Sanskrit. He became an influential figure in Kham and eastern Tibet, in matters of religion as well as in secular administration and diplomacy. He was influential in saving Palpung monastery when an army from the Tibetan government of Central Tibet occupied Kham in 1865.

Kongtrül was affected by the political and inter-religious conflict going on in Tibet during his life and worked together with other influential figures, mainly Jamyang Khyentse Wangpo (1820–1892) and also with the Nyingma treasure revealer Chogyur Lingpa (1829–1870) and Ju Mipham Gyatso (1846–1912). Kongtrül and his colleagues worked together to compile, exchange and revive the teachings of the Sakya, Kagyu and Nyingma, including many near-extinct teachings. This movement came to be named Rimé (Ris med), “nonsectarian,” or “impartial,” because it held that there was value in all Buddhist traditions, and all were worthy of study and preservation. According to Sam van Schaik, without this collecting and printing of rare works, the later suppression of Buddhism by the Communists would have been much more final.

Jamgon Kongtrül's personal hermitage was Kunzang Dechen Osel Ling (kun bzang bde chen 'od gsal gling), "the Garden of Auspicious Bliss and Clear Light", and was built on a rocky outcrop above Palpung monastery. It became an important center for the practice of three year retreats. This is also where he composed most of his major works. Kongtrül's works, especially his 10 volume  The Treasury of Knowledge. has been very influential, especially in the Kagyu and Nyingma schools.

Philosophy 
Besides promoting a general inclusiveness and non-sectarian attitude towards all the different Buddhist lineages and schools, Kongtrül was known to promote a shentong view of emptiness as the highest view.

His view of Prasangika Madhyamaka is outlined in the following verse from the Treasury of Knowledge:

According to Kongtrül, the difference between prasangika and svatantrika Madhyamaka is:

Kongtrül also held that "Shentong Madhyamaka" was a valid form of Madhyamaka, which was also based on the Buddha nature teachings of the third turning and Nagarjuna's "Collection of Praises". For him, this Shentong Madhyamaka is the view which holds that the Ultimate truth, the "primordial wisdom nature, the dharmata":

However, he makes it clear that "The Shentong view is free of the fault of saying that the ultimate is an entity." Furthermore, Kongtrül states:

Finally, on the difference between Rangtong and Shentong, Kongtrül writes in the Treasury of Knowledge:

Tulkus
There have been several recognized tulkus (incarnations) of Lodro Thaye.

2nd Jamgon Kongtrul (1902–1952)
The biography of Khakyab Dorje, 15th Karmapa Lama mentions he had a vision in which he saw 25 simultaneous emanations of the master Jamgön Kongtrül. Preeminent among these was Karsé Kongtrül (1904–10 May 1952). Karsé Kongtrül was born as the son of the 15th Karmapa: Karsé means "son of the Karmapa". His formal religious name was as Jamyang Khyentsé Özer.

Karsé Kongtrül was identified and enthroned by his father at age twelve in 1902, in Samdrub Choling at the monastery of Dowolung Tsurphu. Karsé Kongtrül resided at Tsadra Rinchen Drak, the seat of his predecessor in eastern Tibet. He received the full education and lineage transmission from the Karmapa. Among his other teachers were Surmang Trungpa Chökyi Nyinche, the 10th Trungpa tulku. He attained realization of the ultimate lineage, was one of the most renowned Mahamudra masters and transmitted the innermost teachings to Rangjung Rigpe Dorje, 16th Karmapa. On many occasions he gave teachings, empowerments, and reading transmissions from the old and new traditions, such as the Treasury of Precious Termas (Rinchen Terdzö), and he rebuilt the retreat center of Tsandra Rinchen Drak, his residence at Palpung Monastery. Karsé Kongtrül died on 10 May 1952 at the age of 49.

3rd Jamgon Kongtrul (1954–1992)
The 3rd Jamgon Kongtrul, Karma Lodrö Chökyi Senge, a tulku of Khyentse Özer, was born on 1 October 1954 matrilineal grandson of (later Lt Gen) Ngapoi Ngawang Jigme. He fled to India in 1959 in the aftermath of the 1959 Tibetan uprising and grew up at Rumtek Monastery in Sikkim under the care of Rangjung Rigpe Dorje, 16th Karmapa. Recognized as an incarnation of the previous Jamgon Kongtrul by the Karmapa.

Jamgon Kongtrul Rinpoche travelled with the Karmapa to the United States in 1976 and 1980. He engaged in building monasteries and initiated plans for a home for the elderly and a health clinic in Nepal.

On 26 April 1992, a mysterious accident occurred in Darjeeling District, India, with Jamgon Kongtrul as a passenger, when a new BMW veered off the road into a tree. He was thirty-seven years old. The accident took place near Rinpoche's monastery and a residential school that he founded for young monks and orphans.

4th Jamgon Kongtrul (1995 to present)

The 4th Jamgon Kongtrul, Lodro Choyki Nyima Tenpey Dronme, was born in the wood pig year in Central Tibet on the 26th of November 1995. His birth was prophesied by The Seventeenth Karmapa, Ögyen Trinley Dorje, who also recognised, confirmed the authenticity of his incarnation, and proclaimed it to the world. The prophecy, the search, and the recognition of the Fourth Jamgon Kongtrul Rinpoche are told in the book E MA HO! published by the Jamgon Kongtrul Labrang and can be obtained from Pullahari Monastery and viewed on www.jamgonkongtrul.org. He spent time between Kagyu Tekchen Ling and Pullahari Monastery, the monastic seats in India and Nepal founded by the Third Jamgon Kongtrul Rinpoche. Jamgon Kongtrul Labrang gave his studies, training, and the receiving transmissions from the Lineage Masters.  Annually, he also attended the Kagyu Monlam in Bodhgaya, India, led by the Seventeenth Gyalwa Karmapa, and led the Kagyu Monlam in Kathmandu, Nepal. On April 14, 2016, the Jamgon Yangsi left Pullahari monastery and his monastic vows, stating he wanted to pursue his 'dream of becoming a doctor'.

The 4th Jamgon Kongtrul Mingyur Drakpa Senge was born on 17 December 1995 in Nepal.

The day before he was born, the late  Chogye Trichen Rinpoche said in front of many Lamas and Tulkus: "Like prophesied ... today Jamgon Rinpoche arrived."

In 1996, when the 17th Gyalwang Karmapa Trinley Thaye Dorje, arrived in Bodhgaya, when he met the young Jamgon Rinpoche for the first time. Yangsi Rinpoche despite his young age was able to spontaneously pick up some rice and toss it into the air as a mandala offering, Straight away he exclaimed: "This is the Jamgon Yangsi (Reincarnation) indeed!" He then issued a recognition letter and gave him a name Karma Migyur Drakpa Senge Trinley Kunkhyab Palzangpo.

In 1998, when the Dalai Lama was visiting Bodhgaya, the Yangsi Rinpoche had a private audience with him, where they showed him the recognition letter and the 14th Dalai Lama performed the hair cutting ceremony for the 4th Jamgon Yangsi. In 2000, Drubwang Pema Norbu (Penor Rinpoche), was invited to the Karma Monastery in Bodhgaya, and he performed the vast and profound enthronement ceremony of 4th Jamgon Kongtrul Rinpoche, again reconfirmed Jamgon Yangsi as reincarnation of the great Jamgon Kongtrul.

Source:

Works
The main corpus of Jamgön Kongtrül Lodrö Thaye vast scholarly activities (comprising more than ninety volumes of works in all) is known as the Great Treasuries:

The Treasury of Encyclopedic Knowledge, summarizing the entire sutric and tantric paths.
The Treasury of Precious Instructions, a compendium of empowerments and oral instructions of what he formulated as the "Eight Great Chariots" of the instruction lineages in Tibet.
The Treasury of Kagyü Mantras, a compendium of rituals, empowerments and oral instructions for the Yangdak, Vajrakilaya and Yamantaka deities of the Nyingma kama tradition, and the tantra cycles from the Sarma lineages of Marpa and Ngok.
The Treasury of Precious Termas, a massive compilation of termas.
The Uncommon Treasury, which contains Jamgön Kongtrül Lodrö Thaye's own profound terma revelations.
The Treasury of Extensive Teachings, which includes various related works, such as praises and advice, as well as compositions on medicine, science and so on.

The Treasury of Knowledge
Jamgon Kongtrul's (1813–1899) The Infinite Ocean of Knowledge consists of ten books or sections and is itself a commentary on the root verses 'The Encompassment of All Knowledge' which is also the work of Jamgon Kongtrul.  The Encompassment of All Knowledge are the root verses to Kongtrul's autocommentary The Infinite Ocean of Knowledge and these two works together are known as 'The Treasury of Knowledge'. Tibetan Text

Of the Five, the Treasury of Knowledge was Jamgon Kongtrul's magnum opus, covering the full spectrum of Buddhist history, philosophy and practice. There is an ongoing effort to translate it into English. It is divided up as follows:

Book One: Myriad Worlds (Snow Lion, 2003. )
Book Two: The Advent of the Buddha (parts 2, 3, and 4 forthcoming)
Part One: The Teacher's Path to Awakening
Part Two: The Buddha's Enlightenment
Part Three: The Buddha's Twelve Deeds
Part Four: Enlightenment's Bodies and Realms
Book Three: The Buddha's Doctrine—The Sacred Teachings
Part One: What Are the Sacred Teachings?
Part Two: Cycles of Scriptural Transmission
Part Three: Compilations of the Buddha's Word
Part Four: Origins of the Original Translations' Ancient Tradition (Nyingma)
Book Four: Buddhism's Spread Throughout the World
Part One: Buddhism's Spread in India
Part Two: How Buddhist Monastic Discipline and Philosophy Came to Tibet
Part Three: Tibet's Eight Vehicles of Tantric Meditation Practice
Part Four: The Origins of Buddhist Culture
Book Five: Buddhist Ethics (Snow Lion, 2003. )
Book Six: The Topics for Study
Part One: A Presentation of the Common Fields of Knowledge and Worldly Paths
Part Two: The General Topics of Knowledge in the Hinayana and Mahayana
Part Three: Frameworks of Buddhist Philosophy (Snow Lion, 2007. )
Part Four: Systems of Buddhist Tantra (Snow Lion, 2005. )
Book Seven: The Training in Higher Wisdom
Part One: Gaining Certainty about the Keys to Understanding
Part Two: Gaining Certainty about the Provisional and Definitive Meanings in the Three Turnings of the Wheel of Dharma, the Two Truths and Dependent Arising
Part Three: Gaining Certainty about the View
Part Four: Gaining Certainty about the Four Thoughts that Turn the Mind
Book Eight: The Training in Higher Meditative Absorption (Samadhi)
Part One, Two: Shamatha and Vipashyana; The Stages of Meditation in the Cause-Based Approaches (forthcoming)
Part Three: The Elements of Tantric Practice (Snow Lion, 2008). 
Part Four: Esoteric Instructions, A Detailed Presentation of the Process of Meditation in Vajrayana (Snow Lion, 2008.  )
Book Nine: An Analysis of the Paths and levels to Be Traversed (forthcoming)
Part One: The Paths and Levels in the Cause-Based Dialectical Approach
Part Two: The Levels and Paths in the Vajrayana
Part Three: The Process of Enlightenment
Part Four: the Levels in the Three Yogas
Book Ten: An Analysis of the Consummate Fruition State (forthcoming)
Part One: the Fruition in the Dialectical Approach
Part Two: The More Common Attainment in the Vajrayana
Part Three: The Fruition in the Vajrayana
Part Four: The Fruition State in the Nyingma School

Other works published in English translation
 
 
 
 
 
 
 
 
 
  (restricted circulation)

See also
Simhamukha

References

External links
 A Brief Biography by Ven. Bokhar Rinpoche
 3rd Jamgon Kongtrul Karma Lodro Chokyi Senge according to Beru Khyentse Rinpoche, father of one recognition
 4th Jamgon Kongtrul Karma Migyur Drakpa Senge recognized by Thaye Dorje, son of Beru Khyentse Rinpoche
 4th Jamgon Kongtrul Chokyi Nyima recognized by Ogyen Trinley Dorje and the Dalai Lama
 Lotsawa House – translations of texts by and about Jamgon Kongtrul

1813 births
1899 deaths
Jamgon Kongtrul incarnations
Kagyu lamas
Nyingma lamas
Rinpoches
Tertöns
Tibetan Buddhists from Tibet
Shentong
Tibetan Buddhist monks
Tibetan Buddhism writers